Uttaradit Province Stadium is a multi-purpose stadium in Uttaradit Province, Thailand. It is currently used mostly for football matches and is the home stadium of Uttaradit F.C. The stadium holds 3,245 people.

Multi-purpose stadiums in Thailand
Buildings and structures in Uttaradit province
Sport in Uttaradit province